Ju-On: The Grudge is a 2002 Japanese supernatural horror film written and directed by Takashi Shimizu. It is the third installment in the Ju-On series and the first to be released theatrically (the first two being direct-to-video productions). It stars Megumi Okina, Misaki Ito, Takashi Matsuyama, and Yui Ichikawa.

Ju-On: The Grudge premiered at the Screamfest Film Festival on 18 October 2002, by Lions Gate Films. The film received favourable reviews from critics, but was unfavourably compared to another Japanese horror film, Ring. It spawned a franchise, an American remake, 2006 and 2009 sequels and a 2020 sidequel to the remake, and a prequel television series entitled JU-ON: Origins which premiered in 2020.

Plot 

Several years prior to the main plot, Takeo Saeki murders his wife Kayako after discovering she is in love with another man, also killing the family cat, Mar, and his son, Toshio. The murders create a curse that revives the family as vengeful ghosts, with Kayako's ghost murdering Takeo. Whoever enters their house in Nerima, Tokyo, is eventually consumed by the curse, which spreads to the place they die in and in turn consumes anyone who comes in.

The latest owners of the house are the Tokunaga family, consisting of salaryman Katsuya, his wife Kazumi, and his ill mother Sachie. Kazumi is quickly consumed by the curse, and Katsuya is emotionally affected by Takeo's personality before dying too. Katsuya's sister Hitomi dies shortly after Kayako's spirit follows her to her office and then her apartment.

Social worker Rika is sent by her boss Hirohashi to care for Sachie. She discovers Toshio, and witnesses Sachie being killed by Kayako's ghost, causing her to faint. Hirohashi finds Rika and contacts the police. Detectives Nakagawa and Igarashi discover Katsuya's and Kazumi's bodies in the attic, and later learn of Hitomi's disappearance and the death of a security guard at her workplace. Hirohashi's body is discovered, and Rika is haunted by the ghosts.

Upon researching the history of the house and the Saeki murders, Nakagawa and Igarashi contact a retired detective named Toyama, who is afraid of revisiting the case. Toyama goes to burn the house down but hears a group of teenage girls upstairs. One flees while the others are consumed. Kayako appears, chasing Toyama away but killing Nakagawa and Igarashi. Toyama eventually dies, leaving behind a daughter named Izumi. As a teenager, Izumi went to the house with her friends but fled while her friends were killed by Kayako; this was the event Toyama witnessed in the past.

Izumi is wrought with guilt for abandoning her friends and becomes increasingly paranoid and unstable. Two of her other friends visit her and discover Izumi and her dead friends have their eyes blackened out in photos. Izumi encounters a vision of her dead father, then discovers the ghosts of her friends watching her. She is cornered by her dead friends, only for Kayako to appear and drag her into damnation.

Some time after visiting the house, Rika has moved on with her life. Her friend Mariko, an elementary school teacher, pays a visit to Toshio, who is registered as her student but has never shown up for class. Rika races to save her but is too late. Kayako's ghost comes after her, and Rika witnesses Kayako briefly take on her appearance. She realizes that she is doomed to play out the curse and the same fate as Kayako. With Toshio watching from the banisters, Takeo’s ghost descends the stairs and kills her.

In the deserted Tokyo streets, many missing persons posters lie on the ground. Rika's corpse, now with a much longer hairstyle similar to Kayako, lies in the house's attic, only to reawaken with a death rattle.

Cast
 Megumi Okina as Rika Nishina
 Misa Uehara as Izumi Toyama
 Tomomi Kobayashi as Young Izumi 
 Misaki Ito as Hitomi Tokunaga
 Yui Ichikawa as Chiharu
 Takako Fuji as Kayako Saeki
 Yuya Ozeki as Toshio Saeki
 Takashi Matsuyama as Takeo Saeki
 Yōji Tanaka as Yûji Tôyama
 Kanji Tsuda as Katsuya Tokunaga
 Shuri Matsuda as Kazumi Tokunaga
 Kayoko Shibata as Mariko Uki
 Hirokazu Inoue as Detective Kenichi Nakagawa
 Daisuke Honda as Detective Daisuke Igarashi
 Risa Odagiri as Saori Takamiya 
 Kaori Nakajô as Chiaki Nakano
 Kana Kobayashi as Ayano Muto
 Yukako Kukuri as Miyuki
 Hideo Sakaki as Welfare Center Clerk
 Chikako Isomura as Sachie Tokunaga
 Yoshiyuki Morishita as Security Guard 
 Miho Fujima as Joshi Ana
 Isao Yatsu as Saito

Production

Ju-On: The Grudge was filmed entirely in Tokyo. Some critics have identified loose connections between the story in the film and the traditional Japanese folktale Yotsuya Kaidan.

Remake

In 2004, Sony Pictures Entertainment released an American remake of the film. The film was directed by Takashi Shimizu and starring Sarah Michelle Gellar and Jason Behr. The main plot of the film followed Rika's experience within the house but with a different ending. Its sequel, The Grudge 2, however, mirrors a similar ending where Aubrey Davis meets the same fate as Rika.

A sidequel of the original 2004 American film was released on January 3, 2020.

Release
Ju-on: The Grudge was shown on 18 October 2002 at the Screamfest Horror Film Festival in Los Angeles California under the title The Grudge. The film was also released as part of the Toronto International Film Festival's "Midnight Madness" screening in September 2003.

Ju-On was given a limited theatrical release by Solar Films in the Philippines on 26 November 2003. The film received a limited theatrical release in the United States on 23 July 2004.

In the United States, the film grossed a total of $325,680 from 23 July – 9 December 2004.
Ju-on: The Grudge was released on DVD by Lions Gate on 9 November. The disc contains an audio commentary with Sam Raimi and Scott Spiegel and interviews with the cast and crew.

A sequel to the film titled Ju-on: The Grudge 2 also directed by Shimizu was released in 2003.

Reception
At Metacritic, a website which assigns a rating out of 100 for reviews from mainstream critics, the film has received an average score of 48, based on 22 reviews indicating "mixed or average reviews". The Washington Post gave the film a mixed reviewing, stating that it "isn't particularly scary. No, it's much harder on you than mere fright: It's... creepy" and "it lacks any interest in conventional narrative and doesn't bother with hero or heroine, or with any sense of coherency, of any mechanism of solution of its mystery". David Kehr of The New York Times compared the film unfavorably to The Ring (1998), opining that Ju-on: The Grudge "turns into a rote series of killings, with each new sequence introduced by a title with the name of its primary victim. Because there is a new hero to identify with every 10 minutes, the viewer isn't drawn into a sustained suspense, but is merely subjected to a series of more or less foreseeable shocks". Kim Newman gave the film three stars out of five in Empire, noting that "as a film, it is at once too much a part of an overarching story and divided into too many episodes to be all of a piece. However, as a sustained collection of scare moments, it's a winner". Derek Elley compared the film unfavorably to both The Ring and Dark Water, writing that "in the end, The Grudge comes down to little more than when and where the ghostly little boy will next appear, and the final explanation is so-what".

See also
 List of ghost films
 List of horror films of 2002
 Yotsuya Kaidan, a traditional Japanese folktale featuring similarities to the Ju-On plot.

References

External links
 
 
 
  

2002 films
2000s Japanese-language films
2000s psychological horror films
2000s supernatural films
2002 horror films
Filicide in fiction
Films about curses
Films directed by Takashi Shimizu
Films set in Tokyo
Films shot in Tokyo
Japanese ghost films
Japanese horror films
Japanese nonlinear narrative films
Japanese supernatural horror films
Japanese psychological horror films
Ju-On films
Lionsgate films
Mariticide in fiction
Uxoricide in fiction
2000s Japanese films